Tunb District is a district (bakhsh) in Abumusa County, Hormozgan Province, Iran. At the 2006 census, its population was 155, in 49 families.  The District is entirely rural, and includes the islands of Greater and Lesser Tunbs. The District has one rural district: Tunb Rural District.

References 

Districts of Hormozgan Province
Abumusa County